Graham Daniels is a former professional football player and coach. He is the General Director of Christians in Sport and holds associate positions at St Andrew the Great Church, Cambridge and Ridley Hall Theological College, Cambridge. Daniels is a director of Cambridge United F.C..

Daniels joined Cardiff City as a schoolboy and continued playing for the club while studying philosophy at Cardiff University from 1980 to 1983. He left Wales to play for Cambridge United from 1983 to 1985. During this period, Daniels became a Christian. Consequently, he moved to neighbours Cambridge City, where he played until 1991, in order to combine his football career with theological studies at the University of London between 1985 and 1989. On completing training for Christian ministry, Daniels joined the staff of Christians in Sport in 1989.When Daniels retired from playing, he began his management career in 1990 as assistant manager at Sudbury Town in the Southern League. There followed spells as manager of Eastern Counties League club Histon in 1994-96 and the Southern League with Cambridge City in 1996–99. In 2000, Daniels became an associate staff member of St Andrew the Great Church, Cambridge, where he continues to speak regularly. He joined the Cambridgeshire Football Association as Head Youth Coach in 2000 and was subsequently involved with coaching local clubs until 2012. Daniels was a member of the Cambridgeshire FA Council between 2013 and 2018.

Daniels moved from football coaching and management to a board role when he returned to Cambridge United in September 2013. 

  He has been chair of the club's Community Trust since joining the Board. When new owner Paul Barry purchased the club, he seconded Daniels to become Director of Football from 2017 to 2020. 
 Daniels worked alongside Ben Strang, who was appointed Head of Football, to develop a long-term management strategy. The immediate impact of Barry's ownership was a mutual agreement with Head Coach, Shaun Derry, that he would leave the club. Assistant Head Coach Joe Dunne replaced Derry, with Mark Bonner promoted to Assistant Head Coach. During this period, the club continued to strengthen its board while noting the immediate challenges faced in rebuilding the club. Joe Dunne left the club in December 2018. He was replaced by the vastly experienced Colin Calderwood, with Mark Bonner retained as Assistant Head Coach. Ben Strang was also promoted to Sporting Director, and Daniels returned to his previous, non-executive role on the board. Cambridge United were promoted to League One in the following season, 2021-22. In 2022, Daniels became an inaugural board member of the Cambridge United Women's Team.

In light of his experience in combining the Christian faith with professional football, Daniels has published two popular books explaining the relationship between Christianity and Sport. He has spoken widely about the themes of faith and sport. The growing cultural interest in mental health led Daniels to explore the relationship between Christian faith and athletic well-being.
 
 In 2020 he published a joint paper on 'Sports Chaplaincy, Theology and Social Theory Disrupting Performance-Based Identity in Elite Sporting Contexts'. Daniels gained a PhD for his thesis entitled 'Identity Formation in Christian Professional Footballers' from the University of Gloucestershire in 2022. The same year, he was appointed Associate of Ridley Hall Theological College, Cambridge.

References 

1962 births
Living people
Welsh footballers
Cambridge United F.C. players
Cambridge City F.C. players
Cambridge City F.C. managers
Welsh Protestant ministers and clergy
Association football midfielders
Association football fullbacks
Welsh football managers